Czech Lion Award for Best Actor in Leading Role is an annual award given to the best male actor in a leading role of a Czech film.

Winners

External links

Film awards for lead actor
Czech Lion Awards
Awards established in 1993